Morrison v. National Australia Bank, 561 U.S. 247 (2010), was a United States Supreme Court case concerning the extraterritorial effect of U.S. securities legislation.  Morrison extinguished  two species of securities class-action claims that had proliferated in preceding years: "foreign-cubed" claims, in which foreign plaintiffs sued foreign issuers for losses on transactions on foreign exchanges, and "foreign-squared" claims, brought by domestic plaintiffs against foreign issuers for losses on transactions on foreign exchanges.

Background 
The case concerned the 1998 purchase by National Australia Bank of a mortgage servicing company, HomeSide Lending, headquartered in Florida. In July 2001, NAB announced a USD 450 million write-down in assets due to losses associated with HomeSide Lending; and a further USD 1.75 billion write-down in September of that year. The root cause of the write-down was that the modelling done by HomeSide Lending to determine future revenues from mortgage fees was based on overly optimistic assumptions. The plaintiffs claimed that this was part of an intentional scheme to defraud committed by HomeSide's management. By the time the case reached the US Supreme Court, only Australian investors remained as plaintiffs, although a US investor (Morrison, for whom the case was named) participated in earlier proceedings, but his case was thrown out for unrelated reasons.

The plaintiffs argued that the fact the alleged fraud occurred in Florida meant that it should be subject to US securities laws. The defendants argued that, since the alleged fraud related to trading in Australian securities, US securities laws did not apply.

Opinion of the Court 
The decision was unanimous in favour of the defendants (albeit with Justice Sotomayor recusing herself, given that she had been involved in the case at the Second Circuit). However, different reasons were given. The majority opinion, by Scalia, held that since the plain language of section 10(b) only applies to US securities, it should not be read to apply to non-US securities, despite long-standing precedent, originating in the 2nd Circuit, and since adopted by other circuits also, that 10(b) also applies to non-US securities.

The Court clarified a "longstanding principle of American law that legislation of Congress, unless a contrary intent appears, is meant to apply only within the territorial jurisdiction of the United States." It noted that “the Second Circuit believed the Exchange Act’s silence about §10(b)’s extraterritorial application permitted the court to ‘discern’ whether Congress would have wanted the statute to apply. This disregard of the presumption against extraterritoriality has occurred over many decades in many courts of appeals and has produced a collection of tests for divining congressional intent that are complex in formulation and unpredictable in application. The results demonstrate the wisdom of the presumption against extraterritoriality. Rather than guess anew in each case, this Court applies the presumption in all cases, preserving a stable background against which Congress can legislate with predictable effects.”

Stevens filed a partial concurrence, which Ginsburg joined, rejecting the overturning of the existing jurisprudence on section 10(b); at the same time, he held that in this particular case, the defendants should prevail, since both the plaintiffs and defendants were Australian, and the case would be better dealt with by the Australian court system – but unlike the majority, he would apply 10(b) to cases involving non-US securities, where there was a closer connection to the US (e.g. US plaintiffs).

Aftermath 
The Dodd–Frank Wall Street Reform and Consumer Protection Act of July 21, 2010, in its section 929P(b), allowed the SEC and DOJ extraterritorial jurisdiction, but this interpretation remains contested in the courts. In its section 929Y, the Act commissioned the SEC to study extending the permission to private actors. The study indicated a number of options for action to be taken by Congress, which in varying degrees would mitigate the decision.

In late 2010, Fabrice Tourre of Goldman Sachs asked for dismissal of an SEC suit against him based on the repercussions of the decision in this case, claiming his deals were outside the US and thus not subject to certain US laws.

See also 
 List of United States Supreme Court cases, volume 561
 US corporate law
 Dodd–Frank Wall Street Reform and Consumer Protection Act
 Extraterritorial jurisdiction

Notes

External links
 
 Entry at SCOTUSBlog

United States Supreme Court cases
2010 in United States case law
United States securities case law
United States Supreme Court cases of the Roberts Court
National Australia Bank
Extraterritorial jurisdiction